CCHS may refer to:

Medical
 Congenital central hypoventilation syndrome, a disorder that results in respiratory arrest during sleep

Societies
Carleton County Historical Society, New Brunswick, Canada
Columbia County Historical Society, New York, United States

Schools

Canada
Carver Christian High School, Burnaby, British Columbia

United Kingdom
 England
 Carlisle and County High School for Girls (former grammar school), now Richard Rose Central Academy
Chatsmore Catholic High School, Goring-by-Sea, Worthing, West Sussex
Chelmsford County High School for Girls, Chelmsford, Essex
Clacton County High School, Clacton-on-Sea, Essex
Codsall Community High School, Codsall, Staffordshire
Colchester County High School for Girls, Colchester, Essex
Cramlington Learning Village, Cramlington, Northumberland

United States
Allentown Central Catholic High School, Pennsylvania
Camden Catholic High School, Cherry Hill, New Jersey
Cañon City High School, Cañon City, Colorado
Carroll County High School (Virginia)
Cathedral Catholic High School, San Diego, California
Central Cabarrus High School, Concord, North Carolina
Charleston Catholic High School, West Virginia
Charlotte Catholic High School, Charlotte, North Carolina
Cherry Creek High School, Greenwood Village, Colorado
Chicago Christian High School, Palos Heights, Illinois
Chicopee Comprehensive High School, Chicopee, Massachusetts
Chilton County High School, Clanton, Alabama
Christopher Columbus High School (Miami-Dade County), Florida
Clarke Central High School, Athens, Georgia
Clarke County High School (Berryville, Virginia), Berryville, Virginia
Clay-Chalkville High School, Clay, Alabama
Coal City High School, Illinois
Colleton County High School, Walterboro, South Carolina
Colonie Central High School, Colonie, New York
Colquitt County High School, Georgia
Communitas Charter High School, San Jose, California
Concord-Carlisle High School, Concord, Massachusetts
Conley-Caraballo High School, Hayward, California
Cooper City High School, Cooper City, Florida
Copper Canyon High School, Glendale, Arizona
Corner Canyon High School, Draper, Utah
Covenant Christian High School (Michigan)
Covington Catholic High School, Park Hills, Kentucky
Cross Creek High School, Augusta, Georgia
Cross County High School, Cross County, Arkansas
Culpeper County High School, Culpeper, Virginia
Culver City High School, Culver City, California
Culver Community High School, Culver, Indiana
Wheeling Central Catholic High School, Wheeling, West Virginia
Carbondale Community High School, Carbondale, Illinois
Culpeper County High School, Culpeper, Virginia

See also
Campbell County High School (disambiguation)
Catholic Central High School (disambiguation)
CCH (disambiguation)
Central Catholic High School (disambiguation)
Chung Cheng High School (disambiguation)
Clear Creek High School (disambiguation)
Columbus High School (disambiguation)
Cypress Creek High School (disambiguation)